Dubai is a 2005 box office Filipino drama film shot in the United Arab Emirates, telling the story of three Overseas Filipino Workers who unexpectedly become connected by friendship and love. The film stars Aga Muhlach and John Lloyd Cruz, who play brothers, and Claudine Barretto, who plays the woman with whom the two men fall in love at the same time. The film was released by Star Cinema. Barretto and Cruz both remain in Ikaw ang Lahat sa Akin until it ended nearly 2 months later on November 4.

Plot summary
Raffy and Andrew were orphaned as kids and had only each other to depend on. Raffy has spent the last nine years of his life working in Dubai. His ultimate goal is to fulfill a lifelong dream: to eventually move to Canada with his younger brother, Andrew. The Alvarez brothers are finally united when Andrew goes to Dubai.

In Dubai, Andrew meets Faye, one of Raffy's many girlfriends. They hit it off well in spite of their age difference. She becomes his guide, comfort and lover. Seeing the two together, Raffy realizes that he still and really loves Faye. When Andrew discovers that Raffy still loves Faye, conflict arises between the brothers, almost severing the ties that bind them. In the end, what they choose and achieve are not as planned, but their experiences in Dubai lead to new beginnings in their lives.

Cast and characters

Main cast
Aga Muhlach as Raffy
John Lloyd Cruz as Andrew
Claudine Barretto as Faye

Supporting cast
Michael de Mesa as Basi
Pokwang as Cookie
Dimples Romana as Clarice
Ana Capri as Lenny
Mico Aytona as young Raffy
John Manalo as young Andrew
Phoemela Baranda as Melba
Mymy Davao as Lita
Gino Paul Guzman as Nilo
Ivan Camacho as Pol
 Quay Evano
Jinkee Buzon-Castillo

Production

Pre-production
In February 2004, Scriptwriter Ricky Lee, along with co-writer Shaira Mella Salvador, director Rory Quintos and producer Tess Fuentes, flew to Dubai in the United Arab Emirates to conduct research for the film and interview various Overseas Filipino Workers in the emirate. The interviews would serve as a composite for the film.

Development
Two months after the production teams visit to Dubai, Director Quintos along with the three main cast and a skeleton crew composed of 13 people went to Dubai to shoot the movie. Among the shooting locations were the Dubai International Airport, Burj Al-Arab, Dubai Creek and Sheikh Zayed Road. Scenes were also shot in a shopping mall, a bazaar (souq) and in the desert.

Scriptwriter Lee remarks about the reason about making the film tens years later, in 2015: “While I don’t remember much about making Dubai, I do remember that what we wanted to show was that no matter where a Filipino is, wherever he is in the world, he will remain a Filipino,” Lee says. “That being a Filipino is not about where you are, it’s something ingrained in the heart.”

Release
The film premiered in Philippine cinemas on September 28, 2005. In October 2005, the film was screened in the United Arab Emirates for three days at the Al Nasr Cinema in Dubai.

Soundtrack
"Ikaw Lamang"
Composed by Ogie Alcasid
Performed By Gary Valenciano

See also
 Filipinos in the United Arab Emirates

References

External links
 

2005 films
2000s Arabic-language films
2000s Tagalog-language films
Films set in Dubai
Films shot in the United Arab Emirates
2005 romantic drama films
Star Cinema films
Philippine romantic drama films
Films directed by Rory Quintos